KRSX (95.9 FM) is a radio station licensed to serve Goldendale, Washington, USA and The Dalles, Oregon radio market.  The station is owned by Gorge Country Media.

History
The adult contemporary format now on 95.9 was originally heard on 103.1 K276EE and KYYT-HD2. The sign-on date of the format on this translator is unknown. On July 3, 2015 KRSX signed on as a new signal, owned by Sunnylands Broadcasting, but operated by Haystack Broadcasting under a local marketing agreement. In January 2016, Haystack Broadcasting sold its stations to Gorge Country Media.

References

External links

Radio stations established in 2015
2015 establishments in Oregon
RSX (FM)